Mesolamia is a genus of longhorn beetles of the subfamily Lamiinae, containing the following species:

 Mesolamia aerata Broun, 1893
 Mesolamia marmorata Sharp, 1882

References

Desmiphorini